Plou is a Breton language toponym element meaning "community" or "parish" (< Latin plebs)

It may also refer to the following places:

Plou, Aragon, in the Province of Teruel, Spain
Plou, Cher, France